The 1971 Allan Cup was the Canadian senior ice hockey championship for the 1970–71 senior "A" season.  The event was hosted by the Galt Hornets and Galt, Ontario.  The 1971 playoff marked the 63rd time that the Allan Cup has been awarded.

Teams
Galt Hornets (Eastern Canadian Champions)
Calgary Stampeders (Western Canadian Champions)

Playdowns

Allan Cup Best-of-Seven Series
Galt Hornets 4 - Calgary Stampeders 2
Galt Hornets 7 - Calgary Stampeders 6 (2OT)
Galt Hornets 3 - Calgary Stampeders 2 (2OT)
Galt Hornets 4 - Calgary Stampeders 3

Eastern Playdowns
Semi-final
Galt Hornets defeated Thunder Bay Twins 3-games-to-1
Galt Hornets 8 - Thunder Bay Twins 5
Galt Hornets 4 - Thunder Bay Twins 3
Thunder Bay Twins 7 - Galt Hornets 2
Galt Hornets 8 - Thunder Bay Twins 1
Final
Galt Hornets defeated Grand Falls Cataracts 3-games-to-2
Galt Hornets 4 - Grand Falls Cataracts 2
Grand Falls Cataracts 6 - Galt Hornets 3
Galt Hornets 5 - Grand Falls Cataracts 2
Grand Falls Cataracts 3 - Galt Hornets 1
Galt Hornets 6 - Grand Falls Cataracts 3

Western Playdowns
Round Robin
Yorkton Terriers 6 - St. Boniface Mohawks 5
Nelson Maple Leafs 5 - Calgary Stampeders 1
Calgary Stampeders 4 - Yorkton Terriers 0
Nelson Maple Leafs 7 - St. Boniface Mohawks 3
Calgary Stampeders 11 - St. Boniface Mohawks 3
Yorkton Terriers 8 - Nelson Maple Leafs 7
Final
Calgary Stampeders 4 - Nelson Maple Leafs 2

External links
Allan Cup archives 
Allan Cup website

Allan Cup